The geography of Ukraine varies greatly from one region of the country to another, with the majority of the country lying within the East European Plain. Ukraine is the second-largest European country, after Russia. Its various regions have diverse geographic features ranging from highlands to lowlands, as well as climatic range and a wide variety in hydrography.

The landscape of Ukraine consists mostly of fertile steppes and plateaus, crossed by rivers such as the Dnieper, Siverskyi Donets, Dniester and the Southern Bug as they flow south into the Black Sea and the smaller Sea of Azov. To the southwest, the delta of the Danube forms the border with Romania.

Ukraine also has a number of highland regions such as the Volyn-Podillia Upland (in the west) and the Near-Dnipro Upland (on the right bank of the Dnieper). To the east there are the south-western spurs of the Central Russian Upland, over which runs the border with the Russia. Near the Sea of Azov can be found the Donets Ridge and the Near Azov Upland. The snow melt from the mountains feeds the rivers and their waterfalls.

Significant natural resources in Ukraine include lithium, natural gas, kaolin, timber and an abundance of arable land. Despite this, the country faces a number of major environmental issues such as inadequate supplies of potable water, air and water pollution, deforestation, and radioactive contamination in the north-east from the 1986 accident at the Chernobyl Nuclear Power Plant.

Geographic location

Ukraine is located in Eastern Europe: lying on the northern shores of the Black Sea and the Sea of Azov. The country borders Belarus in the north, Poland, Slovakia and Hungary in the west, Moldova and Romania in the south-west, and Russia in the east.

The land border of Ukraine totals . The border with Russia, part of which runs through the Sea of Azov, is the country's longest border.

The village of Vel'ké Slemence is split between Slovakia and Ukraine.

Relief 

Most of its territory lies within the Great European Plain, while parts of western regions and southern regions lay within the Alpine system. In general Ukraine comprises two different biomes: mixed forest towards the middle of the continent, and steppe towards the Black Sea littoral. Major provinces include, Polesian Lowland, Dnieper Lowland, Volhynia-Podolie Plateau, Black Sea-Azov Lowland, Donets-Azov Plateau, Central Russian Upland, Carpathians, and Pannonian Basin.

The western regions feature an alpine-like section of Carpathian Mountains, the Eastern Carpathians that stretches across Poland, Ukraine and Romania. Mountains are limited to the west, the southern tip of Ukraine on the Sea of Azov. The western region has the Carpathian Mountains, and some eroded mountains from the Donets Ridge are in the east near the Sea of Azov.

Most of Ukraine's area is taken up by the steppe-like region just north of the Black Sea. Most of Ukraine consists of fertile plains (or steppes) and plateaus. In terms of land use, 58% of Ukraine is considered arable land; 2% is used for permanent crops, 13% for permanent pastures, 18% is forests and woodland, and 9% is other.

Physiographic division of Ukraine
Most of Ukraine consists of regular plains with the average height above sea level being . It is surrounded by mountains to its west and extreme south. Wide spaces of the country's plains are located in the south-western part of the East European Plain. The plains have numerous highlands and lowlands caused by the uneven crystallized base of the East European craton. The highlands are characterized by Precambrian basement rocks from the Ukrainian Shield.

Plains are considered elevations of no more than  among which there are recognized lowlands (plains) and uplands (plateaus, ridges, hill ridges).

Great European Plain (subregion East European Plain)
 Volhynia-Podillia Upland (Volhynia-Podillia Plateau)
 Volhynian Upland
 Podolian Upland
 Small Polesia Plain
 Khotyn Upland (part of Moldavian Plateau)
 Roztocze
 Sian-Dniester Lowland
 Eastern Carpathian Foothills
 Polesian Lowland
 Dnieper Upland
 Dnieper Lowland
 Central Russian Upland 
 Donets-Azov Plateau
 Donets Upland
 Azov Upland
 Donets Ridge
 Black Sea-Azov Lowland
 Black Sea Lowland
 Crimean Lowland
 Azov Lowland

Alpine system
 Transcarpathian Lowland (extension of Great Hungarian Plain, part of Eastern Pannonian Basin)
 Eastern Carpathians (part of Carpathian Mountains)
 Outer Eastern Carpathians (more Eastern Beskids and the Ukrainian Carpathians)
 Inner Eastern Carpathians (more Vihorlat-Gutin Area)
 Crimean Mountains

Soil 

From northwest to southeast the soils of Ukraine may be divided into three major aggregations:

 a zone of sandy podzolized soils
 a central belt consisting of the extremely fertile Ukrainian black earth (chernozems)
 a zone of chestnut and salinized soils

As much as two-thirds of the country's surface land consists of black earth, a resource that has made Ukraine one of the most fertile regions in the world and well known as a "breadbasket". These soils may be divided into three broad groups:

 the southernmost belt, which is even thinner and has still less humus

Interspersed in various uplands and along the northern and western perimeters of the deep chernozems are mixtures of gray forest soils and podzolized black-earth soils, which together occupy much of Ukraine's remaining area. All these soils are very fertile when sufficient water is available. However, their intensive cultivation, especially on steep slopes, has led to widespread soil erosion and gullying.

The smallest proportion of the soil cover consists of the chestnut soils of the southern and eastern regions. They become increasingly salinized to the south as they approach the Black Sea.

Hydrography

The territory of Ukraine is bordered by the waters of the Black Sea and the Sea of Azov. More than 95% of the rivers are part of those two seas' drainage basins. A few rivers are part of the Baltic Sea basin. There are seven major rivers in Ukraine: Desna, Dnipro, Dnister, Danube, Prypiat, Siverian Donets, and Southern Buh.

Climate 

Ukraine has a mostly temperate climate, with the exception of the southern coast of Crimea which has a subtropical climate. The climate is influenced by moderately warm, humid air coming from the Atlantic Ocean. Precipitation is disproportionately distributed; it is highest in the west and north and lowest in the east and southeast.

Water availability from the major river basins is expected to decrease, especially in summer. This poses risks to the agricultural sector. The negative impacts of climate change on agriculture are mostly felt in the south of the country, which has a steppe climate. In the north, some crops may be able to benefit from a longer growing season. The World Bank has stated that Ukraine is highly vulnerable to climate change.

Natural resources 

Significant natural resources in Ukraine include: iron ore, manganese, natural gas, titanium, kaolin, uranium, and arable land.

Environmental issues 
Ukraine has many environmental issues. Some regions lack adequate supplies of potable water. Air and water pollution affects the country, as well as deforestation, and radiation contamination in the northeast stemming from the 1986 accident at the Chernobyl Nuclear Power Plant.

See also

 Extreme points of Ukraine
 Maps of Ukraine

References

Notes

External links

 Zastavnyi, F. D. Physical geography of Ukraine: lowlands and uplands of Ukraine. "Heohrafiya".